The Kunnattur block is a revenue block in the Kanchipuram district of Tamil Nadu, India. It has a total of 44 panchayat villages.

References 
 

Revenue blocks in Kanchipuram district